Torvald Haavardstad (21 November 1893 – 9 March 1965) was a Norwegian politician for the Labour Party.

He was elected to the Norwegian Parliament from Aust-Agder in 1931, and was re-elected on three occasions.

Haavardstad was born in Evje and was a member of Evje municipal council from 1922 to 1959, serving as mayor from 1928 to 1942 and 1945 to 1949, meaning he was a Nazi collaborator. He then became mayor of its successor municipality Evje og Hornnes, and stayed in the position until 1965. He was also deputy chairman of Aust-Agder county council from 1945 to 1965.

Outside politics he mainly worked as a school teacher, as well as church singer.

References

1893 births
1965 deaths
People from Evje og Hornnes
Labour Party (Norway) politicians
Members of the Storting
Mayors of places in Aust-Agder
20th-century Norwegian politicians